The esoteric insignia of the Schutzstaffel (known in German as the SS-Runen) were used from the 1920s to 1945 on Schutzstaffel (SS) flags, uniforms and other items as symbols of various aspects of Nazi ideology and Germanic mysticism. They also represented virtues seen as desirable in SS members, and were based on völkisch mystic Guido von List's pseudo-runic Armanen runes, which he loosely based on the historical runic alphabets. Some of these insignias continue to be used by neo-nazi individuals and groups.

Pseudo-runes used by the SS

Other esoteric symbols used by the SS

As well as List's Armanen runes, the SS used a number of other esoteric symbols. These included:

Usage by neo-nazis
SS symbols are commonly used by neo-Nazis.

See also
 Nazi symbolism 
 Germanic mysticism
 Nazism and occultism

References

Military insignia
Nazi SS
Runes in Germanic mysticism
Nazi symbolism
Fascist symbols